Wessel Groenewald Boshoff QC (15 May 1916 – 22 March 1989) was a South African judge, Judge President of the Transvaal Provincial Division of the Supreme Court of South Africa and Judge of Appeal.

Early life and education

Boshoff was born in Amersfoort in the Transvaal Province of the Union of South Africa. He received his schooling at Pretoria Boys High School and at Selborne College in East London. After school he studied law at the University of Pretoria, where he obtained the degrees BA and LLB.

Career

Boshoff practised at the Pretoria Bar from 1940 until 1957. In 1957, he became a puisne judge of the Transvaal Provincial Division of the Supreme Court of South Africa, and in 1976, was appointed Judge President of the Transvaal Division. In 1985, he was elevated to the Supreme Court of South Africa, where he served as appeal judge until his retirement.

Notable cases

Boshoff was the presiding judge in the so-called Little Rivonia Trial, in which several members of the armed resistance organization Umkhonto we Sizwe faced charges of sabotage. In 1985, Boshoff ordered the South African Medical and Dental Council to hold an inquiry into the conduct of the two doctors who treated Steve Biko during the five days before he died, as he found that there was prima facie evidence of misconduct by the doctors.

See also

List of Judges President of the Gauteng Division of the High Court of South Africa

References

1916 births
1989 deaths
South African judges
University of Pretoria alumni
South African Queen's Counsel